Biston falcata is a moth of the family Geometridae. It is found in China (Henan, Shaanxi, Gansu, Hubei, Sichuan).

Subspecies
Biston falcata falcata
Biston falcata satura (Wehrli, 1941)

References

Moths described in 1893
Bistonini